is a railway station in the city of  Toyohashi, Aichi Prefecture, Japan, operated by the Public–private partnership Toyohashi Railroad.

Lines
Mukougaoka Station is a station of the Atsumi Line, and is located 7.1 kilometers from the starting point of the line at Shin-Toyohashi Station.

Station layout
The station has one side platform serving a single bi-directional track. The station is unattended and has an automatic turnstile for use by Manaca IC cards.

Adjacent stations

|-
!colspan=5|Toyohashi Railroad

Station history
Mukougaoka Station was established on January 16, 1959.

Passenger statistics
In fiscal 2017, the station was used by an average of 702 passengers daily.

Surrounding area
Hamagurizawa Park

See also
 List of railway stations in Japan

References

External links

Toyohashi Railway Official home page

Railway stations in Aichi Prefecture
Railway stations in Japan opened in 1959
Toyohashi